Edith Grobade de Oliveira (16 November 1928 – 29 December 1964) was an Olympic backstroke swimmer from Brazil, who competed at two Summer Olympics for her native country. At 19 years old, she was at the 1948 Summer Olympics, in London, where she swam the 100-metre backstroke, not reaching the finals. At 23 years old, she was at the 1952 Summer Olympics, in Helsinki, where she swam the 100-metre backstroke, not reaching the finals.

References

External links
 
Edith de Oliveira's obituary 

1928 births
1964 deaths
Brazilian female backstroke swimmers
Swimmers at the 1948 Summer Olympics
Swimmers at the 1952 Summer Olympics
20th-century Brazilian women